Amadou «Diamou» Diamouténé (born November 3, 1985) is a Malian professional footballer. He currently plays for Djoliba AC.

Personal
Diamouténé was born in Adiopodoumé, Ivory Coast, to Malian parents. In 1999, he moved back to Mali.

Club career
In September 2010, joined Stade Malien. He scored 4 goals in 5 games during his brief time with the club.

USM Alger
On December 29, 2010, Diamouténé signed a two and a half year contract with Algerian club USM Alger. On May 27, 2011, Diamouténé made his debut for USM Alger as a starter in a league match against MC Oran. He played the entire match as USM Alger won 2-0.

International career
Diamouténé represented Mali at all age levels. He was a member of the Malian Under-17 National Team that reached the semi-finals of the 2001 African Under-17 Championship. He played for the Mali national under-20 football team the Tournoi de l'UEMOA 2008.

On April 27, 2009, Diamouténé made his debut for the Malian National Team in a friendly against Equatorial Guinea. Coming as a substitute, he scored a goal in the 87th minute as Mali won the game 3-0.

References

External links

1985 births
Living people
Malian footballers
Mali international footballers
CO de Bamako players
Stade Malien players
Expatriate footballers in Algeria
Malian expatriate sportspeople in Algeria
USM Alger players
Malian expatriate footballers
Algerian Ligue Professionnelle 1 players
NA Hussein Dey players
People from Lagunes District
Association football midfielders
21st-century Malian people